Amman is a surname of German origin. It is an occupational surname for an Ammann, an administrative position in Medieval and early modern German-speaking countries. Notable people with the surname include:

Johann Amman (1707–1741), Swiss-Russian botanist
Jost Amman (1539–1591), Swiss artist
Mir Amman, Urdu writer
Paul Amman (1634–1691), German physician and botanist

References

German-language surnames